Haynsworth is a surname. Notable people with this name include:

Clement Haynsworth (1912–1989), American circuit judge and Supreme Court nominee, namesake of C.F. Haynsworth Federal Building and United States Courthouse
Emilie Virginia Haynsworth (1916–1985), American mathematician, namesake of Haynsworth inertia additivity formula
G. Edward Haynsworth (1922–2012), Episcopalian bishop in Nicaragua and South Carolina
Holt Haynsworth, cinematographer for 2008 documentary miniseries Sex: The Revolution
Matthew E. Haynsworth, acting mayor of Tampa, Florida in 1881
William M. Haynsworth Jr. (1901–1942), American naval officer, namesake of USS Haynsworth